Alexis Peyrotte (1699 - 1769) was a French decorator painter.

Peyrotte was born in Avignon, and was the son of a sculptor. Early in his career he painted in the region of Carpentras parishes and congregations. He participated with Joseph Duplessis to produce art decorations in the pharmacy of the Hôtel-Dieu of Carpentras.

In 1736, he moved to Paris. His decorating work included apartments of the king and queen at Versailles (1738 and 1747), and the Board Room of the Palace of Fontainebleau with Charles-André van Loo, and the Château de Marly. He also worked with the Gobelins Manufactory. He was particularly known for his chinoiserie. A number of his works were engraved and printed by Gabriel Huquier.

References
 Caillet, Robert, Alexis Peyrotte, peintre et dessinateur du roi, 1928.
 Bénézit, Dictionnaire des peintres, sculpteurs, graveurs.
 Alauzen, A., Dictionnaire des peintres et sculpteurs de Provence, Alpes, Côte d'Azur, Editions Jeanne Laffite, 1986.

18th-century French painters
French male painters
1699 births
1769 deaths
Artists from Avignon
18th-century French male artists